Hans Rosenthal (2 April 1925 – 10 February 1987) was a radio editor, director, and one of the most popular German radio and television hosts of the 1970s and 1980s.

Life 
Rosenthal grew up in a Jewish family on Winsstraße No. 63, in the Prenzlauer Berg district of Berlin.  His childhood was marked by an aggressive antisemitic atmosphere, the result of rising German Nazism. His father died of kidney failure in 1937 after he had lost his job at Deutsche Bank AG. When his mother died of colorectal cancer in 1941, Hans and his younger brother Gert (born 1932) found themselves in the orphanage. Starting in 1940, Hans was forced to participate in unfree labour, while his brother was deported and like many other relatives murdered in the Holocaust. After Hans escaped the last major roundup of Berlin Jews (the Fabrikaktion) in early 1943, he went into hiding and until 1945 was able to stay at a safe house in a small garden allotment in Berlin-Lichtenberg, where three German women helped him to survive.

After the war, Rosenthal began an apprenticeship as an assistant director at Berliner Rundfunk, a public broadcaster. However, he soon came into conflict with the supervisors of the Soviet Military Administration and from 1948 onwards worked for the Rundfunk im amerikanischen Sektor (RIAS), a broadcaster controlled by the American occupying forces.

Celebrities had to compete in several fast-paced quiz rounds and games of skill, critiqued by a panel of judges. Even today, Rosenthal is known in Germany for his catchphrase Sie sind der Meinung, das war ... ? ("So you all think that was... ?") when he thought something impressive had been done. The TV audience then answered Spitze! ("Great!"), at which point Rosenthal would jump into the air. Because he was not tall, he was often referred to affectionately as Hänschen Rosenthal (literally "Little Hans").

He was a member of the Central Council of Jews in Germany from the 1960s onwards. He often took his vacation in Utersum on the island of Föhr, of which he was eventually made an honorary citizen. From 1965 until 1973 Rosenthal was chairman of the Tennis Borussia Berlin football club. Rosenthal started a foundation called Schnelle Hilfe in Akuter Not (which roughly translates as "Fast Help in Dire Need").

In 1980, Rosenthal published his autobiography Zwei Leben in Deutschland ("Two Lives in Germany"). In 1986, along with Paul Spiegel, he started an international media agency, which promoted actors, TV presenters and artists. In the same year Rosenthal fell ill with stomach cancer and was no longer able to work as a TV host. He died in 1987 in Berlin, aged 61.

Awards 
 1972 – Federal Cross of Merit (Bundesverdienstkreuz)
 1973 – Bambi
 1974 – Goldene Kamera
 1979 – Goldene Kamera
 1984 – Goldene Kamera
 1985 – Goldene Europa
 1986 – Telestar

Other honours 
 1993 – The square in front of the RIAS building (now the home of Deutschlandradio Kultur) in Berlin-Schöneberg was named Hans-Rosenthal-Platz
 2007 – A sports center in Berlin-Westend was named Hans-Rosenthal-Sportanlage

Bibliography 
 Zwei Leben in Deutschland, Bergisch Gladbach 1980,

References

Sources 
 Leonard Gross : The Last Jews in Berlin, Simon & Schuster, USA 1982, 
 Thomas Henschke: Hans Rosenthal. Ein Leben für die Unterhaltung. Schwarzkopf u. Schwarzkopf, Berlin 1999, 
 Michael Schäbitz, Paul Spiegel, Curth Flatow: Hans Rosenthal. Deutschlands unvergessener Quizmaster; bewusster, stolzer Jude. Jüdische Miniaturen, Band 19. Stiftung Neue Synagoge Berlin – Centrum Iudaicum / Hentrich and Hentrich, Teetz 2004,

External links 
 
 Literature by and about Hans Rosenthal in German National Library
 Hans Rosenthal Foundation (in German)

1925 births
1987 deaths
Deaths from stomach cancer
German game show hosts
20th-century German Jews
German radio personalities
German television personalities
Jewish entertainers
Officers Crosses of the Order of Merit of the Federal Republic of Germany
People from Pankow
Rundfunk im amerikanischen Sektor people
ZDF people
German World War II forced labourers
Mass media people from Berlin